Wilkesboro-Smithey Hotel, also known as the Smithey Hotel or Smithey's Department Store, is a historic hotel building located at Wilkesboro, Wilkes County, North Carolina. It was built in 1891, and is a three-story, nine bay by six bay, brick building.  It features a two-story wraparound gallery porch.

It was listed on the National Register of Historic Places in 1982.

References

Hotel buildings on the National Register of Historic Places in North Carolina
Hotel buildings completed in 1891
Buildings and structures in Wilkes County, North Carolina
National Register of Historic Places in Wilkes County, North Carolina